Lee Andrew Archer, Jr. (September 6, 1919 – January 27, 2010) was an  African-American fighter pilot in the 332nd Fighter Group, commonly known as the Tuskegee Airmen, during World War II. He was one of the first African-American military aviators in the United States Army Air Corps, the United States Army Air Forces and later the United States Air Force, eventually earning the rank of lieutenant colonel.

During World War II, Archer flew 169 combat missions, including bomber escort, reconnaissance and ground attack.  Archer claimed, and was credited with four enemy fighter aircraft shot down, though disputes regarding this record arose after his death.

Archer was one of only four Tuskegee Airmen to have earned three aerial victories in a single day of combat: Joseph Elsberry, Clarence Lester, and Harry T. Stewart Jr.

Early life
Born in, New York, Archer grew up in New York's Harlem neighborhood, later attending New York University. After graduation, he joined the United States Army in the hopes of becoming a pilot. At that time, the Army did not accept black pilots, so Archer was posted to a communications job as a telegrapher and field network-communications specialist in Georgia. When the Army's policy changed, he was accepted to the training program for black aviators at Tuskegee Army Airfield in Alabama, graduating first in his class, and one of only 994 black wartime pilots to graduate there. He was commissioned as a second lieutenant on July 28, 1943.

World War II

Archer is considered by some as the first and—as of 2010—only black U.S. pilot to earn an "ace" designation, for shooting down at least five enemy aircraft. However, during the war, Archer claimed, and was acknowledged to have shot down only four planes.  Years later, Archer stated he and another pilot both claimed victory for shooting down a fifth aircraft, that he was credited for only one half the kill, and that half kill was later taken away.  However, official records show no claim by Archer on the date in question.  Archer's supposed ace status was mentioned in news articles through the time of his death, when it was stated as fact in several obituaries. The original records of his duty were clear.  The discrepancy between these records and the later reporting has caused some controversy.  Archer also destroyed six aircraft on the ground during a strafing mission in August 1944, as well as several locomotives, motor transports and barges.

While flying with the 302nd Fighter Squadron, as a combat pilot, nicknamed "Buddy", Archer flew 169 combat missions in the European Theatre of World War II, flying the Bell P-39 Airacobra, Republic P-47 Thunderbolt and North American P-51 Mustang fighter aircraft.  Flying a P-51C fighter with the distinctive red tail of the 332nd Fighter Group, known collectively as the "Tuskegee Airmen", he scored his first victory, a Messerschmitt Bf 109 on July 18, 1944, over Memmingen, Germany.

Archer is best remembered for his exploits of October 12, 1944. In the midst of a furious series of dogfights over German-occupied Hungary, he shot down three Hungarian Bf 109s over Lake Balaton, Hungary, in engagements that spanned only 10 minutes.

Archer was one of only four Tuskegee Airmen to have earned three aerial victories in a single day of combat: Joseph Elsberry, Clarence Lester, and Harry Stewart, Jr. Moreover, Archer was one of only nine 332nd Fighter Group pilots with at least three confirmed kills during World War II:

 Joseph Elsberry - 332nd Fighter Group's 301st Fighter Squadron - 4 Confirmed Kills, 1 Possible 
 Edward L. Toppins - 332nd Fighter Group's 99th Fighter Squadron - 4 Confirmed Kills, 1 Possible 
 Lee Archer - 332nd Fighter Group's 302nd Fighter Squadron - 4 Confirmed Kills
 Charles B. Hall - 332nd Fighter Group's 99th Fighter Squadron 3 confirmed kills
 Leonard M. Jackson	- 332nd Fighter Group's 99th Fighter Squadron - 3 Confirmed Kills
 Clarence D. Lester - 332nd Fighter Group's 100th Fighter Squadron - 3 Confirmed Kills 
 Wendell O. Pruitt - 332nd Fighter Group's 302nd Fighter Squadron - 3 Confirmed Kills
 Roger Romine - 332nd Fighter Group's 302nd Fighter Squadron - 3 Confirmed Kill, 1 Unconfirmed
 Harry Stewart, Jr. - 332nd Fighter Group's 301st Fighter Squadron - 3 Confirmed Kills

When Archer returned home in 1945 as a recipient of the Distinguished Flying Cross, he found that nothing seemed to have changed in American society. "I flew 169 combat missions when most pilots were flying 50," Archer told the Chicago Tribune in 2004. "When I came back to the U.S. and down that gangplank, there was a sign at the bottom: ′Colored Troops to the Right, White Troops to the Left′."

Archer remained in the armed forces for a career as the United States Army Air Forces transitioned into the present day United States Air Force in 1947. He later flew missions during the Korean War, became a diplomatic officer at Supreme Headquarters Allied Powers Europe (SHAPE) and then became the headquarters chief of the U.S. Air Force Southern Command in Panama, eventually retiring as a lieutenant colonel in 1970.

Later career

After retiring from the military, Archer joined General Foods Corporation in White Plains, N.Y. where he became one of the first black corporate vice presidents of a major U.S. company. While there he also led its small-business investment subsidiary, North Street Capital Corporation, which serviced clients such as Essence Communications and Black Enterprise Magazine. In 1987 he helped establish the food conglomerate TLC Beatrice and in the same year founded the venture capital firm Archer Asset Management. Archer became a longtime resident of New Rochelle, New York.

In October 2005, Archer and four fellow Tuskegee veterans, retired pilot Lt. Colonel Robert Ashby, Retired Master Sgt James A. Sheppard, Retired Colonel Richard Tolliver, and retired Technical Sergeant George Watson Sr. visited Balad Air Base at Balad, Iraq, to meet with 700 servicemen from the 332nd Air Expeditionary Wing, the successor unit to his all-black outfit.

"This is the new Air Force," he told The Associated Press. In the dining room, he said, he saw "black, white, Asian, Pacific Islanders, people from different parts of Europe. This," he said, "is what America is."

Illness and death
In April 2009, Archer was selected to be an adviser for the George Lucas produced film, Red Tails. Archer, aged 90, died at Cornell University Medical Center in New York City on January 27, 2010, as a result of coronary complications, according to his son Roy Archer. His death came during the post-production work on the Lucas film Red Tails, and the film's final credits subsequently bore a tribute to the pilot. At a memorial service for Archer held at the Riverside Church on February 4, entertainer and commentator Bill Cosby gave a eulogy.

Archer was predeceased by his wife, Ina Burdell, who died in 1996 and was survived by his three sons, one daughter and four granddaughters. He is buried at Arlington National Cemetery.

Awards and tributes

Military awards

Other honors
 Archer earned special citations for his work from Presidents Dwight D. Eisenhower, John F. Kennedy and Lyndon B. Johnson.
 Archer and his fellow Tuskegee airmen were awarded the Congressional Gold Medal in 2007.
 Archer was an Honoree of the American Fighter Aces Association.
 Aviation warplane collector and pilot Kermit Weeks restored and flew a P-51 fighter painted in tribute to Archer, in the colorful markings of Archer's "Ina the Macon Belle", originally dedicated to his wife, Ina Burdell.
  A youth flight training program was established in honor of Lee A. Archer Jr. by Glendon Fraser, President of the "Major General Irene Trowell-Harris chapter" of the Tuskegee Airmen, Inc. The Lee A. Archer Jr., Red Tail Youth Flying Program operates out of Newburgh, New York and accepts high school students from the Orange County, New York area.
 Freedom medal

See also
 Dogfights (TV series)
 Executive Order 9981
 List of Tuskegee Airmen
 Military history of African Americans
 The Tuskegee Airmen (movie)

References

Notes

Citations

Bibliography

 Cooper, Charlie, Ann Cooper and Roy La Grone. Tuskegee's Heroes. St. Paul: Minnesota: Motorbooks International Publishing Company, 1996. .
 Francis, Charles E. The Tuskegee Airmen. Boston: Bruce Humpries, Inc., 1955.
 Francis, Charles E. and Adolph Caso. The Tuskegee Airmen: The Men Who Changed a Nation. Boston: Branden Books, 1997. .
 Haulman, Daniel L., Eleven Myths About the Tuskegee Airmen. Montgomery, Alabama: New South Books, 2011.  
 Tillman, Barrett. "Tales of the Red Tails; Inside the Tuskegee Legend: The men, the machines, the missions." Flight Journal, February 2012.

External links

 Lee Archer's oral history video excerpts at The National Visionary Leadership Project
 
 Lieutenant-Colonel Lee Archer – Daily Telegraph obituary

1919 births
2010 deaths
American World War II flying aces
Aviators from New York (state)
Burials at Arlington National Cemetery
Military personnel from New Rochelle, New York
Recipients of the Distinguished Flying Cross (United States)
Recipients of the Air Medal
Recipients of the Meritorious Service Medal (United States)
Chevaliers of the Légion d'honneur
Tuskegee Airmen
United States Air Force officers
United States Army Air Forces officers
Recipients of the Four Freedoms Award
People from New Rochelle, New York
Businesspeople from New York (state)
African-American businesspeople